The 1963 Texas A&M Aggies football team represented Texas A&M University in the 1963 NCAA University Division football season as a member of the Southwest Conference (SWC). The Aggies were led by head coach Hank Foldberg in his second season and finished with a record of two wins, seven losses and one tie (2–7–1 overall, 1–5–1 in the SWC).

Schedule

References

Texas AandM
Texas A&M Aggies football seasons
Texas AandM Aggies football